Cecil Bertram Potter (born 14 November 1888 in West Hoathly, West Sussex) was a professional manager at Huddersfield Town, Derby County and Hartlepools United.

Huddersfield Town won the First Division three times in 1923–24, 1924–25 and 1925–26. The first two were won under the management of Herbert Chapman but the third title was won under Potter in 1926.

See also 
 List of English football championship winning managers

References

99 Years & Counting — Stats & Stories — Huddersfield Town History

1888 births
Year of death missing
English football managers
People from Mid Sussex District
Hartlepool United F.C. managers
Derby County F.C. managers
Huddersfield Town A.F.C. managers
English Football League managers